Phyllocnistis hyperbolacma is a moth of the family Gracillariidae, known from Honshū, Japan. It was named by E. Meyrick in 1931.

References

Phyllocnistis
Endemic fauna of Japan
Moths of Japan